Los Beat 4 is a Chilean rock band from that enjoyed early success in the 1960s and early 1970s, influenced by the wave of Beatlemania. Among their contributions to Chilean music is recording one of the first Chilean rock albums recorded in Spanish, Boots A Go-Go.

History
Los Beat 4 was formed in 1966 in San Miguel, Chile. They formed part of the Chilean new wave movement, along others such as Pato Renan, Cecilia and others. They had many hits, including "Dame un Bananino", a jingle for a Nestle ice cream product.

Band members

 Reinaldo "Rhino" González – voice (1966–1971)
 Johnny Paniagua – guitar (1966–1971)
 Willy Benítez – bass (1966–1971)
 Mario Benítez – drums (1966–1971)
 Linden Mandiola – bass (1971)

References

1966 establishments in Chile
Chilean musical groups